Ohgoto Dam is a rockfill dam located in Tochigi prefecture in Japan. The dam is used for irrigation. The catchment area of the dam is 1.6 km2. The dam impounds about 5  ha of land when full and can store 289 thousand cubic meters of water. The construction of the dam was started on 1976 and completed in 1986.

References

Dams in Tochigi Prefecture
1986 establishments in Japan